Smakh  is a Syrian village located in Salamiyah Subdistrict in Salamiyah District, Hama.

References 

Populated places in Salamiyah District